Rose Hill is a town in Duplin County, North Carolina, United States. Its population was 1,626 at the 2010 census. Rose Hill claims to be the home of the world's largest frying pan.

History
A post office called Rose Hill was established in 1872. The town was named for the abundance of wild roses near the original town site.

Geography
Rose Hill is located in southwestern Duplin County at  (34.825767, -78.025901). U.S. Route 117 passes through the center of town, leading north  to Warsaw and south  to Wallace. Interstate 40 passes just east of the town, with access from exit 380. It leads south  to Wilmington and north  to Raleigh.

Demographics

2020 census

As of the 2020 United States census, there were 1,371 people, 823 households, and 554 families residing in the town.

2000 census
As of the census of 2000,  1,330 people, 542 households, and 377 families resided in the town. The population density was 969.4 people per square mile (374.8/km). The 594 housing units averaged 433.0 per square mile (167.4/km). The racial makeup of the town was 62.93% White, 25.26% African American, 0.75% Native American, 0.53% Asian, 0.08% Pacific Islander, 9.92% from other races, and 0.53% from two or more races. Hispanics or Latinos of any race were 14.74% of the population.

Of the 542 households, 26.8% had children under the age of 18 living with them, 51.1% were married couples living together, 14.6% had a female householder with no husband present, and 30.3% were not families. About 27.7% of all households were made up of individuals, and 15.3% had someone living alone who was 65 years of age or older. The average household size was 2.45 and the average family size was 2.92.

In the town, the population was distributed as 21.3% under the age of 18, 9.5% from 18 to 24, 27.3% from 25 to 44, 24.4% from 45 to 64, and 17.6% who were 65 years of age or older. The median age was 39 years. For every 100 females, there were 86.0 males. For every 100 females age 18 and over, there were 82.4 males.

The median income for a household in the town was $27,794, and for a family was $36,786. Males had a median income of $27,171 versus $17,411 for females. The per capita income for the town was $16,943. About 15.7% of families and 19.9% of the population were below the poverty line, including 21.2% of those under age 18 and 16.9% of those age 65 or over.

Notable people
 Ralph Britt, NFL tight end
 Aaron Fussell, North Carolina politician and educator
 Wendell H. Murphy, farmer and North Carolina politician
 Jamie Pickett Ultimate Fighting Championship Middleweight Athlete

References

External links
Town of Rose Hill official website

Towns in Duplin County, North Carolina
Towns in North Carolina